This article uses a Portuguese surname: his surname is Gomes da Rocha, not Rocha. 

Tiago Henrique Gomes da Rocha (born 4 February 1988) is a Brazilian former security guard and serial killer who has claimed to have killed 39 people. He approached his victims on a motorbike and shouted "robbery" before shooting them. However, he never took anything. He targeted homeless people, women and homosexuals in Goiás. His youngest victim was a 14-year-old girl killed in January 2014 and 16 of his victims were women. Gomes da Rocha was arrested after being caught riding a motorbike with a fake plate. He earlier caught the attention of police after they discovered that he was facing trial for stealing the number plate off a motorbike at a supermarket in Goiania in January 2014. A motorbike, stolen plates and the suspected murder weapon, a .38 revolver, were retrieved from a home he shared with his mother. He attempted suicide in his prison cell on 16 October 2014 by slashing his wrists with a smashed light bulb. Gomes da Rocha has claimed to have gained murderous urges after being sexually abused by his neighbor at age 11.

In May 2016, he was convicted of 11 murders and sentenced to 25 years in prison.

See also
List of serial killers by country
List of serial killers by number of victims

References

21st-century Brazilian people
21st-century criminals
Brazilian murderers of children
Brazilian prisoners and detainees
Brazilian serial killers
Living people
Male serial killers
Prisoners and detainees of Brazil
Robbers
Security guards
Violence against gay men
1988 births